Avangard is a rural locality (a village) in Unkosovskoye Rural Settlement of Chuchkovsky District, Ryazan Oblast, Russia. The population was 370 as of 2018. There are 8 streets.

History 
The village of the Central Branch of the Unkosovo State Farm was renamed to Vanguard by a decree of the Presidium of the Armed Forces of the RSFSR In 1966.

Geography 
Avangard is located 12 km east of Chuchkovo (the district's administrative centre) by road. Unkosovo is the nearest rural locality.

References 

Rural localities in Ryazan Oblast